Ivalu Sujatha is an Indian Kannada language television drama that premiered on Colors Kannada on 26 August 2019. The show formally came to an end in June 2020. The show is an official remake of the Marathi television show Sukhachya Sarini He Man Baware.

Cast 
 Yeaswanth as Partha
 Meghasri as Sujatha
 Aparna as Durga, Partha’s mother
 Girija Lokesh as Aaji, Partha’s grandmother

Adaptations

References 

2019 Indian television series debuts
Kannada-language television shows
2020 Indian television series endings
Colors Kannada original programming